Transparent in Your Presence is the second and final gospel CD recorded by Byron Cage & Purpose. It was recorded at New Birth Missionary Baptist Church in Atlanta, GA (Bishop Eddie L. Long, Pastor), and was released in the summer of 1996.  The album peaked at #2 on the U.S. Gospel charts.

Track listing

Byron Cage albums
1996 live albums